A nonpast tense (abbreviated ) is a grammatical tense that distinguishes a verbal action as taking place in times present or future, as opposed to past tense. This can be illustrated in English, where future is not a separate form of the verb, as demonstrated by forms such as I hope he gets [nonpast] better tomorrow, where the future modal will is not required the way a true tense would be. (Compare past tense I hope he got better yesterday, where the gets form is not grammatical.) 

Grammatical tenses